The Copa Chile (Chile Cup) is an annual cup competition for Chilean football teams. Due to time constraints and club pressure, the trophy was cancelled in 2000, but returned in 2008. Its precursor was the Campeonato de Apertura (Opening Championship), played from 1933 to 1950.

The cup is now open to every member club of the Chilean football league system, from professional teams; (Primera División, Primera B & Segunda División), down to teams from the ANFA: Tercera División. Since the season 2009, the winners obtained a direct Copa Sudamericana spot for the next season, however this was change starting from the 2015 edition; since then the winners obtains a direct Copa Libertadores spot for the next season.

In the history of the tournament, the Primera División teams have dominated the competition; but, because this is contested in a knockout tournament format, the opportunity for lower-level teams upsetting a top level squad is a real possibility. That was the case in the seasons 1960, 1962, 2009 & 2010, when the winners were clubs from the second level: Deportes La Serena, Luis Cruz, Unión San Felipe and Municipal Iquique. A major upset almost occurred in the 2008 competition, when Deportes Ovalle (from the third level league) became finalist, losing 1–2 to Universidad de Concepción at the final, in a very close match.

In some seasons the tournament only included first level teams, that was the case the seasons: 1979 to 1984, 1986, 1987, 1989-Invierno, 1990, 1998 and 2000.

Only two clubs have become double champions (league and cup winners the same season); Colo-Colo in 1981, 1989, 1990 & 1996, and Universidad de Chile in 2000.

Trophy

At the end of the final, the winning team is presented with a trophy, also known as the Copa Chile, which they hold until the following year's final.  
 
The cup stands 120 centimetres tall and is made of 8 kg of pure solid silver, its design includes the map of the Chilean territory (being four times around the trophy), made with stones of different colors, carved agate, Onyx and lapis lazuli.

The trophy was forged in 1974, in the Hernán Baeza Rebolledo workshop, located in the commune of San Miguel. Its manufacture took nearly a month.

As well as winning the right to keep the trophy until the start of the next season, the winner gets to have a badge small silver plate at the pedestal of the trophy. The badge has the winners' name and the year of success.

Finals

Titles by club

Titles by Region
The following table lists the Chilean Cup champions by region.

Other Official Cup Tournaments

Copa de la República

Copa Invierno

Notes and references

Sources
Chile Cup - RSSSF

 
Football competitions in Chile
Chile
Recurring sporting events established in 1958
1958 establishments in Chile